Kanthalad  is a village in Kozhikode district in the state of Kerala, India.

Demographics
At the 2001 India census, Kanthalad had a population of 9,100 with 4,451 males and 4,649 females.

Transportation
Kanthalad village connects to other parts of India through Vatakara town on the west and Kuttiady town on the east.  National highway No.66 passes through Vatakara and the northern stretch connects to Mangalore, Goa and Mumbai.  The southern stretch connects to Cochin and Trivandrum.  The eastern National Highway No.54 going through Kuttiady connects to Mananthavady, Mysore and Bangalore. The nearest airports are at Kannur and Kozhikode.  The nearest railway station is at Vatakara.

References

Villages in Kozhikode district
Kuttiady area